Heather Goodall,  is an Australian academic and historian. She is Emeritus Professor at the University of Technology Sydney. Her research and writing focuses on Indigenous and environmental history and intercolonial networks.

Goodall graduated from the University of Sydney in 1975 and was awarded the University Medal in History. She received a PhD from the same university in 1982 for her thesis "A History of Aboriginal Communities in New South Wales, 1909–1939".

Awards and recognition
Goodall won the inaugural Australian History Prize at the New South Wales Premier's History Awards in 1997 for Invasion to Embassy and a Rona Tranby Award in 1998. She won the Magarey Medal for biography in 2005 for Isabel Flick, co-written by the subject, Isabel Flick. 

Goodall was elected a Fellow of the Academy of the Social Sciences in Australia in 2007. She is also a Fellow of the Royal Society of New South Wales.

Rivers and Resilience was shortlisted for the Community and Regional History Prize at the New South Wales Premier's History Awards in 2010.

Selected works

 Invasion to Embassy: Land in Aboriginal politics in New South Wales, 1770–1972, Allen & Unwin with Black Books, 1996 
 Isabel Flick: The Many Lives of an Extraordinary Aboriginal Woman, co-written by Isabel Flick, Allen & Unwin, 2004 
 Rivers and Resilience: Aboriginal people on Sydney's Georges River, co-written by Allison Cadzow, UNSW Press, 2009 
 Beyond Borders: Indians, Australians and the Indonesian Revolution, 1939 to 1950,  Amsterdam University Press, 2018

References

Australian historians
Fellows of the Academy of the Social Sciences in Australia
Fellows of the Royal Society of New South Wales
Living people
University of Sydney alumni
Academic staff of the University of Technology Sydney
Year of birth missing (living people)